Autumn Carole Federici is an American model, producer, and actress.

Early life
Federici was born in Pittsburgh, Pennsylvania.

Career
Federici has appeared in horror films including 616: Paranormal Incident, Murder Eleven, and Haunting of the Innocent. Her other films include Flutter, Love, Wedding, Marriage, The Blackout, and Circle.

Filmography

References

External links

Year of birth missing (living people)
Living people
21st-century American women
Actresses from Pittsburgh
American film actresses
American women film producers
Female models from Pittsburgh
Film producers from Pennsylvania